The 1996 ITC Diepholz round was the sixth round of the 1996 International Touring Car Championship season. It took place on 7 July at the Diepholz Airfield Circuit.

Bernd Schneider won both races, driving a Mercedes C-Class.

Classification

Qualifying

Notes:
 – Ratanakul Prutirat failed to set a lap time within 107% of the fastest time during the weekend. As a result, the driver failed to qualify for the race.

Race 1

Notes:
 – The race was red-flagged on lap 29 and not restarted after Gabriele Tarquini's crash.

Race 2

Standings after the event

Drivers' Championship standings

Manufacturers' Championship standings

 Note: Only the top five positions are included for both sets of drivers' standings.

References

External links
Deutsche Tourenwagen Masters official website

1996 International Touring Car Championship season